A sock puppet is defined as a person whose actions are controlled by another.  It is a reference to the manipulation of a simple hand puppet made from a sock, and is often used to refer to alternative online identities or user accounts used for purposes of deception. Online, it came to be used to refer to a false identity assumed by a member of an internet community who spoke to, or about, themselves while pretending to be another person. 

The use of the term has expanded to now include other misleading uses of online identities, such as those created to praise, defend, or support a person or organization, to manipulate public opinion, or to circumvent restrictions, such as viewing a social media account that they are blocked from, suspension, or an outright ban from a website. A significant difference between a pseudonym and a sock puppet is that the latter poses as a third party independent of the main account operator. Sock puppets are unwelcome in many online communities and forums.

History
The practice of writing pseudonymous self-reviews began before the Internet. Writers Walt Whitman and Anthony Burgess wrote pseudonymous reviews of their own books, as did Benjamin Franklin.

The Oxford English Dictionary defines the term without reference to the internet, as "a person whose actions are controlled by another; a minion" with a 2000 citation from U.S. News & World Report.

Wikipedia has had a long history of problems with sockpuppetry. On October 21, 2013, the Wikimedia Foundation (WMF) condemned paid advocacy sockpuppeting on Wikipedia and, two days later on October 23, specifically banned Wiki-PR editing of Wikipedia. In August and September 2015, the WMF uncovered another group of sockpuppets known as Orangemoody.

Types

Block evasion

One reason for sockpuppeting is to circumvent a block, ban or other form of sanction imposed on the person's original account.

Ballot stuffing
Sockpuppets may be created during an online poll to increase the puppeteer's votes. A related usage is the creation of multiple identities, each supporting the puppeteer's views in an argument, attempting to position the puppeteer as representing majority opinion and sideline opposition voices. In the abstract theory of social networks and reputation systems, this is known as a sybil attack.

A sockpuppet-like use of deceptive fake identities is used in stealth marketing. The stealth marketer creates one or more pseudonymous accounts, each claiming to be a different enthusiastic supporter of the sponsor's product, book or ideology.

Strawman sockpuppet
A strawman sockpuppet (sometimes abbreviated as strawpuppet) is a false flag pseudonym created to make a particular point of view look foolish or unwholesome in order to generate negative sentiment against it. Strawman sockpuppets typically behave in an unintelligent, uninformed, or bigoted manner, advancing "straw man" arguments that their puppeteers can easily refute. The intended effect is to discredit more rational arguments made for the same position. Such sockpuppets behave in a similar manner to Internet trolls.

A particular case is the concern troll, a false flag pseudonym created by a user whose actual point of view is opposed to that of the sockpuppet. The concern troll posts in web forums devoted to its declared point of view and attempts to sway the group's actions or opinions while claiming to share their goals, but with professed "concerns". The goal is to sow fear, uncertainty and doubt (FUD) within the group.

Meatpuppet

Some online sources use the term "meatpuppet" to describe sockpuppet behaviors. For example, according to one online encyclopedia, a meatpuppet "publishes comments on blogs, wikis and other public venues about some phenomenon or product in order to generate public interest and buzz"—that is, they are engaged in behavior more widely known as "astroturfing". A 2006 article in The Chronicle of Higher Education defined a meatpuppet as "a peculiar inhabitant of the digital world—a fictional character that passes for a real person online."

Investigation of sockpuppetry
A number of techniques have been developed to determine whether accounts are sockpuppets, including comparing the IP addresses of suspected sockpuppets and comparative analysis of the writing style of suspected sockpuppets. Using GeoIP  it is possible to look up the IP addresses and locate them.

Legal implications of sockpuppetry in the United States 

In 2008, 49-year-old Missouri resident Lori Drew was prosecuted and found guilty by a Federal Court jury in connection with the creation of a MySpace account on which she claimed to be a 16-year-old boy named Josh Evans. Drew's goal had been to create a relationship with Megan Meier, a 13-year-old girl who had been in conflict with Drew's daughter. After "Josh" ended the relationship with Megan, Megan committed suicide. Drew was found guilty in connection with misrepresenting her identity in violation of the MySpace terms of service.

Although the Los Angeles U.S. Attorney claimed that this conduct was covered by federal computer fraud legislation against "accessing a computer without authorization via interstate commerce", the trial court granted a motion by Drew to throw out the verdict. Drew successfully argued that her use of a false identity did not constitute unauthorized access to MySpace, citing a 1973 breach of contract dispute where a court of appeals ruled that "fraudulently induced consent is consent nonetheless." The prosecution appealed the trial court judge's decision to throw out the guilty verdict, but later dropped its appeal.

In 2010, in People v. Golb, 50-year-old lawyer Raphael Golb was convicted on 30 criminal charges, including identity theft, criminal impersonation, and aggravated harassment, for using multiple sockpuppet accounts to attack and impersonate historians he perceived as rivals of his father, Norman Golb. Golb defended his actions as "satirical hoaxes" protected by free-speech rights. He was disbarred and sentenced to six months in prison, but the sentence was reduced to probation on appeal.

In 2014 a Florida state circuit court held that sock puppetry is tortious interference with business relations, and awarded injunctive relief against it during the pendency of litigation. The court found that "the act of falsifying multiple identities" is conduct that should be enjoined. It explained that the conduct was wrongful "not because the statements are false or true, but because the conduct of making up names of persons who do not exist to post fake comments by fake people to support Defendants' position tortiously interferes with Plaintiffs' business" and such "conduct is inherently unfair." The court, therefore, ordered the defendants to "remove or cause to be removed all postings creating the false impression that more [than one] person are commenting on the program th[an] actually exist." The court also found, however, that the comments of the defendants "which do not create a false impression of fake patients or fake employees or fake persons connected to program (those posted under their respective names) are protected by The Constitution of the United States of America, First Amendment."

Examples of sockpuppetry

Business promotion

In 2007, the CEO of Whole Foods, John Mackey, was discovered to have posted as "Rahodeb" on the Yahoo! Finance Message Board, extolling his own company and predicting a dire future for its rival, Wild Oats Markets, while concealing his relationship to both companies. Whole Foods argued that none of Mackey's actions broke the law.

During the 2007 trial of Conrad Black, chief executive of Hollinger International, prosecutors alleged that he had posted messages on a Yahoo! Finance chat room using the name "nspector", attacking short sellers and blaming them for his company's stock performance. Prosecutors provided evidence of these postings in Black's criminal trial, where he was convicted of mail fraud and obstruction. The postings were raised at multiple points in the trial.

Book and film reviews
An amazon.com computer glitch in 2004 revealed the names of many authors who had written pseudonymous reviews of their books. John Rechy, who wrote the best-selling novel City of Night (1963), was among the authors unmasked in this way, and was shown to have written numerous five-star reviews of his own work. In 2010, historian Orlando Figes was found to have written Amazon reviews under the names "orlando-birkbeck" and "historian", praising his own books and condemning those of fellow historians Rachel Polonsky and Robert Service. The two sued Figes and won monetary damages. 

During a panel discussion at a British Crime Writers Festival in 2012, author Stephen Leather admitted using pseudonyms to praise his own books, claiming that "everyone does it". He spoke of building a "network of characters", some operated by his friends, who discussed his books and had conversations with him directly. The same year, after he was pressured by the spy novelist Jeremy Duns on Twitter, who had detected possible indications online, UK crime fiction writer R.J. Ellory admitted having used a pseudonymous account name to write a positive review for each of his own novels, and additionally a negative review for two other authors.

David Manning was a fictitious film critic, created by a marketing executive working for Sony Corporation to give consistently good reviews for releases from Sony subsidiary Columbia Pictures, which could then be quoted in promotional material.

Blog commentary
American reporter Michael Hiltzik was temporarily suspended from posting to his blog, "The Golden State", on the Los Angeles Times website after he admitted "posting there, as well as on other sites, under false names." He used the pseudonyms to attack conservatives such as Hugh Hewitt and L.A. prosecutor Patrick Frey—who eventually exposed him. Hiltzik's blog at the LA Times was the newspaper's first blog. While suspended from blogging, Hiltzik continued to write regularly for the newspaper.

Lee Siegel, a writer for The New Republic magazine, was suspended for defending his articles and blog comments under the user name "Sprezzatura". In one such comment, "Sprezzatura" defended Siegel's bad reviews of Jon Stewart: "Siegel is brave, brilliant and wittier than Stewart will ever be."

Politically oriented
In late November 2020, TYT Network reported an example of a white male Republican Trump voter having a sockpuppet Twitter account presented as that of a black gay man, criticizing Biden and praising Trump while systematically emphasizing his race and sexual orientation. Additionally, in October of 2020, Clemson University social media researcher identified "more than two dozen of Twitter accounts claiming to be black Trump supporters who gained hundreds of thousands of likes and retweets in a span of just a few days, sparking major doubts about their identities," many using photos of black men from news reports or stock images "including one in which the text 'black man photo' was still watermarked on the image".

Government sockpuppetry

As an example of state-sponsored Internet sockpuppetry, in 2011, a US company called Ntrepid was awarded a $2.76 million contract from U.S. Central Command for "online persona management" operations to create "fake online personas to influence net conversations and spread U.S. propaganda" in Arabic, Persian, Urdu and Pashto as part of Operation Earnest Voice.

On 11 September 2014, a number of sockpuppet accounts reported an explosion at a chemical plant in Louisiana. The reports came on a range of media, including Twitter and YouTube, but U.S. authorities claimed the entire event to be a hoax. The information was determined by many to have originated with a Russian government-sponsored sockpuppet management office in Saint Petersburg, called the Internet Research Agency. Russia was again implicated by the U.S. intelligence community in 2016 for hiring trolls in the 2016 United States presidential election.

The Institute of Economic Affairs claimed in a 2012 paper that the United Kingdom government and the European Union fund charities that campaign and lobby for causes the government supports. In one example, 73% of responses to a government consultation was the direct result of campaigns by alleged "sockpuppet" organizations.

See also

Catfishing
Conflict-of-interest editing on Wikipedia
On the Internet, nobody knows you're a dog
Passing (sociology)
Phishing
Reputation
Shill
Team Jorge
Trojan Horse

References

External links

Sock puppet at The Jargon File

Internet terminology
Internet trolling
Internet manipulation and propaganda
Deception